A total lunar eclipse took place on Monday, September 5, 1960. The moon passed through the center of the Earth's shadow.

This is the 39th member of Lunar Saros 127. The previous event is the August 1942 lunar eclipse. The next event is the September 1978 lunar eclipse.

Visibility
It was visible over the Pacific Ocean, and seen rising over Asia and Australia, and setting over North and South America.

Related lunar eclipses

Lunar year series

Saros series
Lunar saros series 127, repeating every 18 years and 11 days, has a total of 72 lunar eclipse events including 54 umbral lunar eclipses (38 partial lunar eclipses and 16 total lunar eclipses). Solar Saros 134 interleaves with this lunar saros with an event occurring every 9 years 5 days alternating between each saros series.

Tritos 
 Preceded: Lunar eclipse of October 7, 1949

 Followed: Lunar eclipse of October 18, 1967

Tzolkinex 
 Preceded: Lunar eclipse of July 27, 1953

 Followed: Lunar eclipse of October 18, 1967

See also
List of lunar eclipses
List of 20th-century lunar eclipses

Notes

External links

1960-09
1960-09
1960 in science
September 1960 events